An Introduction to the Philosophy of Religion is an 1880 book by the theologian John Caird.

Influence
The philosopher Mark D. Jordan stated that An Introduction to the Philosophy of Religion helped popularized the term "philosophy of religion" in English.

References

Bibliography

 

1880 non-fiction books
Books by John Caird (theologian)
English-language books
Modern philosophical literature
Philosophy of religion literature